43rd meridian may refer to:

43rd meridian east, a line of longitude east of the Greenwich Meridian
43rd meridian west, a line of longitude west of the Greenwich Meridian